The men's high jump event at the 1990 Commonwealth Games was held on 1 February at the Mount Smart Stadium in Auckland.

Results

References

High
1990